Slavko Štancer (26 July 1872 – 16 June 1945) was a Croatia commander-in-chief and inspector-general of the land component of the Domobranstvo in 1941, the army of the Independent State of Croatia during the Second World War. His surname is also sometimes written "Stanzer" or "Stancer".

Stanzer served under the Poglavnik Ante Pavelić and was awarded the honorary title Vitez ("knight") when he received the Order of the Crown of King Zvonimir. Stanzer was appointed commander-in-chief of the ground forces on 16 April 1941. Later, Stanzer headed the Croatian Military court. After the fall of the Independent State of Croatia, Stanzer was captured, tried and sentenced to death by the communist Partisans. He was found dead in his cell the night before his scheduled execution.

References

1872 births
1945 deaths
Austro-Hungarian military personnel of World War I
Croatian collaborators with Fascist Italy
Croatian collaborators with Nazi Germany
Croatian people of World War II
Croatian Home Guard personnel
Recipients of the Order of the Crown of King Zvonimir
Executed Yugoslav collaborators with Nazi Germany
Executed Croatian people